The Grand Wayne Center is a convention center located in downtown Fort Wayne, Indiana, Allen County, United States. As a result of a $42 million renovation and expansion from 2003–2005, the Grand Wayne now encompasses .

Facility

The Grand Wayne Center's north and south façades feature 1,830 floor-to-ceiling exterior windowpanes with two exterior waterfalls, at the intersections of West Jefferson and West Washington Boulevards with Harrison Street.

Two hotels currently join the convention center.  A nine-floor, 244-room attached Hilton Hotel operates at the east wing of the Grand Wayne Center. Also a  six-floor, 250 Room Courtyard by Marriott  attached via a pedestrian bridge operates just south of the main entrance to the Grand Wayne Center.

References

Convention centers in Indiana
Culture of Fort Wayne, Indiana
Economy of Fort Wayne, Indiana
Buildings and structures in Fort Wayne, Indiana
Tourist attractions in Fort Wayne, Indiana